The  IIFA Best Editing  is a technical award chosen ahead of the ceremonies.

The winners are listed below:-

See also 
 IIFA Awards

References

External links
 2008 winners 

International Indian Film Academy Awards
Film editing awards